John Thomas Marryat Hornsby (13 March 1857 – 23 February 1921), generally known as J. T. Marryat Hornsby, was a New Zealand politician of the Liberal Party from the Wairarapa. He was a newspaper editor and proprietor.

Biography

Early life
Hornsby was born at Hobart, Tasmania in 1857. His family moved to Nelson in 1874 and when the other family members returned to Hobart, he remained in New Zealand.

Political career

He was a  Member of Parliament for the  electorate in the 14th (1899–1902), 16th (1905–1908), and 19th (1914–1919) Parliaments.

He defeated Walter Clarke Buchanan (the Conservative sitting member from 1887) in 1899, but lost to him in 1902 and 1908. Buchanan was later the Reform Party candidate.

Hornsby was defeated in 1919 by Alexander Donald McLeod.

Hornsby died at Carterton in 1921.

Notes

Further reading

Works by Hornsby

 There were two issues of this newspaper, printed during June 1892.

Works about Hornsby

Australian emigrants to New Zealand
Local politicians in New Zealand
New Zealand journalists
New Zealand Liberal Party MPs
New Zealand male dramatists and playwrights
Politicians from Hobart
1857 births
1921 deaths
New Zealand MPs for North Island electorates
Members of the New Zealand House of Representatives
Unsuccessful candidates in the 1902 New Zealand general election
Unsuccessful candidates in the 1908 New Zealand general election
Unsuccessful candidates in the 1919 New Zealand general election
Unsuccessful candidates in the 1911 New Zealand general election
Unsuccessful candidates in the 1896 New Zealand general election
Unsuccessful candidates in the 1884 New Zealand general election
19th-century New Zealand politicians
19th-century New Zealand dramatists and playwrights